Loris Campana  (3 August 1926–3 September 2015) was an Italian road and track cyclist who won the gold medal in the men's 4000m team pursuit at the 1952 Summer Olympics, alongside Marino Morettini, Mino de Rossi and Guido Messina.

References

External links
 

1926 births
2015 deaths
Italian track cyclists
Italian male cyclists
Cyclists at the 1952 Summer Olympics
Olympic cyclists of Italy
Olympic gold medalists for Italy
Cyclists from the Province of Mantua
Olympic medalists in cycling
Medalists at the 1952 Summer Olympics